Eternal Flame is Do As Infinity's seventh studio album, released on September 30, 2009. The band had disbanded in September 2005, but reformed three years later in September 2008. This is the first new album the band released after reforming, and is the first album by the band not to have Dai Nagao on the staff, though his song "Tangerine Dream" was remixed as a bonus track. The album contains twelve music tracks plus one bonus track for the limited edition first print release of Eternal Flame. Two of the tracks were originally featured on Do As Infinity's 21st single "∞1" (2009). Three of the songs were featured on Japanese television: "Saigo no Game", "Meramera", and "Piece Of Your Heart". Two different editions of the album were released, CD and CD+DVD.

Between March 14 and April 14, 2009, a contest called Do! Creative!! was held to give Do As Infinity fans a chance to compose songs that the band would later perform. Of the approximately 1000 songs received, three were chosen to be placed on Eternal Flame: "Nighter" composed by Yu, "Kitakaze" composed by Yosuke Kawashima, and "Honō" composed by Shinpei.

Track listing
All music arranged by Seiji Kameda.

Chart positions

Notes
 "Tangerine Dream (10th Anniversary)" was a bonus track only featured in the limited edition first print CD release of Eternal Flame.
 The documentary "Do As Fukkatsu Made no Kiseki" was bonus footage only featured in the limited edition first print CD+DVD release of Eternal Flame.

References

External links
Eternal Flame at Avex Network 

2009 albums
Avex Group albums
Do As Infinity albums
Albums produced by Seiji Kameda